Hubert Michael Newell (February 16, 1904 – September 8, 1987) was an American prelate of the Roman Catholic Church. He served as Bishop of Cheyenne from 1951 to 1978.

Biography

Early life 
Hubert Newell was born on February 16, 1904, in Denver, Colorado, to Thomas and Ellen (née Taney) Newell; his parents were Irish immigrants from County Galway. A twin himself, he had a total of five siblings, including two sisters and three brothers.  Thomas Newell worked as a policeman, then as a smelter worker.

Newell studied under the Sisters of Charity of Leavenworth before attending Sacred Heart High School and Regis College, both in Denver. After deciding to embark on an ecclesiastical career, he entered St. Thomas Aquinas Seminary in Denver for four years of study.

Priesthood 
Newell was ordained to the priesthood for what was then the Diocese of Denver by Bishop John Tihen on June 15, 1930. After his ordination, Newell served as assistant pastor at Our Lady of Sorrows Parish in Walsenburg, Colorado. In 1931, he was transferred to the Immaculate Conception Cathedral Parish in Denver. He was also appointed in 1933 as assistant principal of Cathedral High School in Denver, serving in that post until 1937.

Newell travelled to Washington, D.C. in 1937 to enter the Catholic University of America, obtaining a Master of Educational Administration degree in 1938.  After returning to Denver, he was appointed as superintendent of the parochial schools for the diocese.

Coadjutor Bishop and Bishop of Cheyenne 
On August 2, 1947, Newell was appointed as coadjutor bishop of the Diocese of Cheyenne and titular bishop of Zapara by Pope Pius XII. He received episcopal consecration on September 24, 1947, from Archbishop Urban Vehr, with Bishops Scannel and Philip Garrigan serving as co-consecrators in the Cathedral of the Immaculate Conception in Denver.  Newell was the first native of Denver to be appointed a Catholic bishop. When Bishop Patrick McGovern died on November 8, 1951. Newell became the fifth bishop of Cheyenne.

As bishop, Newell established the diocesan newspaper, The Wyoming Catholic Register, in 1952, citing the need to communicate with parishioners. Also in 1952, he dedicated the new DePaul Hospital in Cheyenne. As part of a national initiative to involve women more in Catholic activities, Newell set up a Council of Catholic Women in Cheyenne.  It was followed by other councils in Wyoming communities and by the Wyoming Council of Catholic Women in 1953. It was accredited by the National Council of Catholic Women that same year.

Newell was also a member of the National Catholic Welfare Conference, where he served on the committee for the Confraternity of Christian Doctrine. Newell suffered a minor heart attack in April 1961, but resumed his duties in August of that year. He attended the Second Vatican Council in Rome from 1962 to 1965.

Retirement and legacy 
On January 3, 1978, Pope Paul VI accepted Newell's resignation as bishop of Cheyenne.  Hubert Newell died on September 8, 1987, in Denver at age 83.

References

External links
Catholic-Hierarchy
Diocese of Cheyenne, 1947-1951
Diocese of Cheyenne, 1951-1978

1904 births
1987 deaths
Regis University alumni
Catholic University of America alumni
Roman Catholic bishops of Cheyenne
20th-century Roman Catholic bishops in the United States
Participants in the Second Vatican Council
Religious leaders from Wyoming